This article provides a list of notable awards for webcomics and some of the winners from each year.

Webcomics may be eligible for any number of literary awards that recognise achievement in comics or literature generally. As examples, webcomic artists have won Ignatz Awards and Eisner Awards, Gene Luen Yang's graphic novel American Born Chinese (originally published as a webcomic on Modern Tales), was the first graphic novel to be nominated for a National Book Award, and Don Hertzfeldt's animated film Everything Will Be OK, which won the 2007 Sundance Film Festival Jury Award in Short Filmmaking, was based on his webcomics.

However, a number of awards have existed that are specifically for webcomics, or which focus mainly on webcomics. This list details these awards, including their source, criteria, and winners.

Awards relating to multiple mediums

Pulitzer Prizes 
The Pulitzer Prize is an award for achievements in newspaper, magazine, online journalism, literature, and musical composition within the United States. In 2010, Mark Fiore won a Pulitzer Prize, becoming the first cartoonist to win a Pulitzer for an entry of entirely online cartoons. Fiore was later also a finalist for the Pulitzer in 2018. In 2012 and again in 2020, Matt Bors was a finalist for the Pulitzer, for his webcomics that appeared in the online magazine he founded, The Nib.  In 2015, Tom Tomorrow was a finalist for the Pulitzer based on his This Modern World comics published by the website Daily Kos.

Ursa Major Awards 

The Ursa Major Awards relate to furry media, such as video, written works, and comics. They were first presented in 2001 for works produced in the previous year. In 2004, a category for comic strips that feature anthropomorphic characters was introduced. Despite the category including all forms of comics, all winners have been webcomics.

Weblog Awards 

The Weblog Awards were held from 2003 to 2008 and featured a Best Comic Strip category starting in 2006.

Comic awards that include a webcomic category

Cartoonist Studio Prize 
Presented by the Slate Book Review and the Center for Cartoon Studies, the Cartoonist Studio Prize was first awarded in 2013 for work produced during the previous year. The award has two categories, "Best Print Comic" and "Best Web Comic".

DiNKY Awards 
Since 2016 the Denver Independent Comics & Arts Expo (DINK) has been giving out comics awards with multiple categories, including the Best Web Comics award.

The category was called "Outstanding Web Comic" in 2016. The following year it was renamed "Best Web Comic".

Eagle Awards 

The Eagle Award was a series of awards for comic book titles and creators voted on by UK fans. It ran from 1977 to 2012 but was not presented every year. From 2001 until its conclusion it included an award for Favourite Web-based Comic. The winners of that category are listed below:

Eisner Award 

The Will Eisner Comic Industry Award, commonly shortened to the Eisner Award, is a prize given since 1988 for creative achievement in American comic books. In 2003, Justine Shaw's Nowhere Girl received a nomination for an Eisner award in the "best new series" category, while Shaw was nominated for "talent deserving of wider recognition", making her the first webcomic artist to be nominated for an Eisner.

In addition to considering works published online for general categories, the Eisner Awards have included categories only for digital works since 2005. The category Best Digital Comic was awarded each year from 2005 through to 2016, though was renamed Best Webcomic in 2009. Paste Magazine noted in 2016 that the Eisner's conflation of "digital comic" and "webcomic" may cause independent works to be overshadowed by online services such as Marvel Unlimited and DC Comics' "Digital First". In 2017, the category was split into "Best Digital Comic" and "Best Webcomic" and as of 2020 these two categories remain.

The table below shows the winners of Best Digital Comic/Webcomic and of Best Webcomic.

Harvey Awards 

The Harvey Awards, named for writer and artist Harvey Kurtzman and originally coordinated by the publisher Fantagraphics, are given for achievement in comic books. The Harveys were created in 1988 as part of a successor to the Kirby Awards which were discontinued after 1987.

The Harvey Awards have included a category for online works since 2006. Originally called Best Online Comic Work, it was renamed to Digital Book of the Year following the 2018 revamp of awards and their move to New York Comic Con.

Ignatz Awards 

The Ignatz Awards are intended to recognize outstanding achievements in comics and cartooning by small press creators or creator-owned projects published by larger publishers. They have been awarded each year since 1997, except for 2001 as the show was cancelled after the September 11, 2001 attacks. Recipients of the award are determined by the votes of the attendees of the annual Small Press Expo.

Comics published online have won awards in multiple categories, such as Chester 5000 winning Outstanding Series and Hark! A Vagrant for Outstanding Anthology or Collection. As well as these, the Ignatz Awards have presented an award for Outstanding Online Comic since 2002.

Joe Shuster Awards 

The Joe Shuster Awards recognise Canadian comic creators, retailers and publishers. The awards have been handed out since 2005 and are administered by the Canadian Comic Book Creator Awards Association.

The Joe Shuster Awards have presented a Webcomics Creator award since 2007. Unlike other categories given by other awards, this award is for a creator or team rather than a work and so can be in recognition of multiple pieces of work. This category is not always presented; it was not presented in 2016, nor in 2019 even though other Joe Shuster Awards were presented in those years. The award will be granted in 2020, with nominees announced and the winner to be announced in late October.

National Cartoonists Society Awards 

The National Cartoonist Society Division Awards (also called the National Cartoonist Society Awards, the Reuben awards, or the Silver Reubens) are awards for cartooning, illustration and animation which have been presented since 1956. They are presented by the National Cartoonists Society, an organization of professional cartoonists in the United States.

The NCS first presented a category for webcomics in 2012. The next year it was split into two categories — Online Comics – Short Form, and Online Comics – Long Form — which remains the set-up through 2019.

The awards are given out in May each year. The naming of each award ceremony is not always consistent, with some ceremonies being referred to as the year they are in, some as the year past, and some not as a year but as a count, eg "the 71st" ceremony. The current naming system appears to be that the award ceremony relates to the previous year; for example, the "2018 Divisional Awards" were presented in May 2019. This is the naming system used in the table below.

Ringo Awards 

The Ringo Awards are given for achievement in comic books. Named for artist Mike Wieringo, the Ringo Awards were founded by Cards, Comics, and Collectibles in Reisterstown, Maryland and the Ringo Awards Committee in 2017 to be the successor to the Harvey Awards that left the Baltimore Comic-Con as its venue in 2016.

The Ringo Awards are nominated by an open vote among comic-book professionals and fans. The winners are selected from the top two fan choices as the first two nominees and the professional jury selects the remaining three nominees in each category.

The Ringo Awards have included a Best Webcomic category since its first awards ceremony in 2017.

Awards exclusively for webcomics

Web Cartoonists' Choice Awards 

The Web Cartoonists' Choice Awards were awarded from 2001 through to 2008. Voting rights were only granted to online cartoonists. These award had a large number of categories – the 2005 ceremony had 26 categories – such as "Best Art", "Best Writing", "Best Gag Comic" and "Best Newcomer". The main category was called "Best Comic" in 2001 and 2002 and called "Outstanding Comic" from 2003–2008. The winners of this main category are below:

Clickburg Webcomic Awards 

The Clickburg Webcomic Awards, also called the Clickies, was a Dutch ceremony held four times between 2005 and 2010. It was created to promote webcomics in the Netherlands and Belgium, and winners were only from those countries. The Clickies were first awarded in 2005 at the world's first webcomic convention, Clickburg. The awards were again bestowed in 2006, 2007, and 2010, each time in a slightly different format. Its categories, which changed each time, included "Epic Clickie", "Gag Clickie", and "Cartoon Clickie".

The Webcomic List Awards 
In 2009 and 2010, users of the internet forum The Webcomic List held an amateur award ceremony, where winners of its various categories were selected through a panel of judges. The ceremony itself was presented in the form of a webcomic, allowing it to spoof televised award shows as well as exhibit sample portions of the awardees. Each awards ceremony gave out nine different awards; the winners of the Best Comic award are listed below:

See also 
 List of comics awards

Notes

References 

 
Comics-related lists
Internet-related lists
webcomics